Abraham (Avi) Kupfer, Ph.D., is a professor of cell biology, and the co-director of immunobiology at the Johns Hopkins University School of Medicine. Abraham discovered the immunological synapse at the National Jewish Medical and Research Center in Denver. He first presented his findings during one of the Keystone symposia in 1995, when he showed three-dimensional images of immune cells interacting with one another. His main focus is on teaching and studying the mechanisms of inter- and intra-cellular communication in the immune system.

Kupfer is a native of Israel.  He received his Ph.D. from the Weizmann Institute of Science.

References

External links
Feb. 2006 Scientific American article on Kupfer's research
 Immunobiology Program - Johns Hopkins University
info page of Kupfer from JHU School of Medicine

Johns Hopkins University faculty
Israeli emigrants to the United States
Living people
21st-century American biologists
Year of birth missing (living people)